Anopsobius relictus is a species of centipede in the Henicopidae family. It is endemic to Australia. It was first described in 1920 by American biologist Ralph Vary Chamberlin.

Distribution
The species occurs in Tasmania.

Behaviour
The centipedes are solitary terrestrial predators that inhabit plant litter and soil.

References

 

 
relictus
Centipedes of Australia
Endemic fauna of Australia
Fauna of Tasmania
Animals described in 1920
Taxa named by Ralph Vary Chamberlin